Andrea Chénier, also spelled Andrea Chenier, is a 1955 French-Italian historical musical melodrama film directed by Clemente Fracassi and starring Antonella Lualdi, Raf Vallone and Michel Auclair. It is loosely based on the eponymous 1896 opera by Umberto Giordano about the eighteenth century poet André Chénier. The film's sets were designed by the art directors Flavio Mogherini and Franco Zeffirelli. It was shot using technicolor and vistavision.

Cast 
Antonella Lualdi as Madeleine de Coigny
Raf Vallone as Gérard
Michel Auclair as Andrea Chénier
Rina Morelli as mother of Andrea
Sergio Tofano as Luigi Chénier
Denis d'Inès as Countess of Coigny
Mario Mariani as Maria Giuseppe Chenier
Denis d'Inès as Countess of Coigny
Piero Carnabuci as Count of Coigny
Maria Zanoli as housekeeper
Piero Carnabuci as count of Coigny
 as Countess of Coigny
 as Incroyable
 as English ambassador to Paris
Antonio Pierfederici as Robespierre
 as Danton
Marco Guglielmi as public prosecutor
Angelo Galassi as president of the court
Valeria Montesi as Idia Le Gray
Marianna Liebl as hunting lady
Claude Beauclair as Louis
Charles Fernley Fawcett as French ambassador to London
Catherine Valnay as Bersy
Nando Cicero

References

External links

1955 films
1950s musical drama films
1950s historical musical films
1950s biographical drama films
Italian historical musical films
Italian biographical drama films
Films directed by Clemente Fracassi
Films set in France
French Revolution films
Lux Film films
French historical musical films
French musical drama films
Italian musical drama films
Opera films
Melodrama films
1950s Italian films
1950s French films
1950s Italian-language films